Kenny Bräck (born 21 March 1966) is a Swedish former race car driver. Until his retirement from racing, he competed in the CART, Indy Racing League and the IROC series. He won the 1998 Indy Racing League championship and the 1999 Indianapolis 500, becoming the first Swedish driver to win the race.

Eighteen months later he made a comeback at the Indy 500 and set the fastest qualifying time of the field. He retired from IndyCar racing after the race.

In 2009, he made a comeback to rally, competing in Rally X at X-Games 15 and winning Gold. Bräck still drives occasionally and won The Dukerie's Stage Rally in Nottingham, England with co-driver Emil Axelsson in June 2011. The duo also won the Swedish classic The Midnight Sun Rally in July 2011. In September Bräck took pole position and won the RAC Tourist Trophy race at the Goodwood Revival in a Shelby Daytona Coupé 1964 together with 9-time 24 Hours of Le Mans winner Tom Kristensen. In September 2013 Bräck won The Whitsun Trophy race at the Goodwood Revival in a Ford GT40 together with Red Bull Racing's Adrian Newey.

Early career
Born in Arvika, Sweden, he grew up in the small village of Glava, where his father taught him to drive cars on the lake-ice in the winters. A neighbor introduced Bräck to racing when he was 13 years of age, working in his business one summer, buying him a go-kart. Apart from the beginning of Bräck's career, he has managed his career himself, from finding sponsors, negotiating contracts to winning races.

Formula racing
He raced in Britain and Sweden in Formula Ford and Formula 3 (he was Swedish junior Formula Ford Champion in 1986), in Europe in Formula Opel Lotus and the Renault Clio Cup (Scandinavian Champion 1992) and in the US in the Barber Saab Pro Series (Champion in 1993).

In 1994 he competed in the International Formula 3000. In 1995 he finished third in the International F3000 championship for Madgwick Racing. In 1996 he was Arrows Formula One test driver but decided to leave the team after mid season concentrating on his European F3000 campaign. Despite winning the last race on the road, after a controversial Clerk of the Course decision he eventually was disqualified from the event and had to settle for the runner-up position in the championship, driving for the British team Super Nova. Had he not been disqualified, Bräck would have been champion.

First IRL stint
Bräck debuted in the IRL in 1997, making his first start for Galles Racing at Phoenix, replacing Jeff Ward, and finishing 11th after an accident.  Over seven starts, he had two top-5 finishes at Charlotte and New Hampshire.

Leading up to his Indianapolis 500 debut in 1997, he showed initial promise early in May. He posted the fastest time on the second day of Rookie Orientation, posting a lap speed of 205.597 mph. He ended up qualifying 15th for the race, in a unique year in which 35 cars formed the starting grid. Unfortunately, on Race Day, in the final pace lap before the green flag, Bräck was caught up in an accident with Stéphan Grégoire and Affonso Giaffone and finished 33rd after being unable to continue.

In 1998, he moved to drive for American racing legend A. J. Foyt. The new team paid dividends, as he won three consecutive races on his way to the IRL championship in 1998.  In his 1999 title defense, he finished runner-up to Greg Ray, including a win at the 1999 Indianapolis 500. After the 1999 season, he left Foyt's team to compete in the CART FedEx Championship Series.

CART career

In 2000 he switched to the CART series, joining Team Rahal and being awarded the Rookie of the Year. He finished second in the driver's championship in 2001, winning a season-high 4 victories and 6 pole positions.  However, he did not have much success on road circuits which is what ultimately cost him that year's title to Gil de Ferran.

In 2001 Bräck also had a minor role in the Hollywood motion picture Driven, which starred Sylvester Stallone and Burt Reynolds.

In 2002, Bräck raced for Chip Ganassi Racing, and he ended the season by winning the CART season finale Mexico City G.P., which turned out to be his only win in major North American open-wheel racing on a road or street circuit.

IROC
In 2001 he competed in the International Race of Champions series in the season called IROC XXV. The series is a stock car invitational in the United States. He finished third in the championship, the highest points position for a non-stock car driver.

Return to IRL
Bräck moved back to the IRL in 2003 with previous CART team owner, Bobby Rahal and his Rahal Letterman Racing team. Bräck finished second place at the Twin Ring Motegi circuit in Japan. In the final race at Texas Motor Speedway, he suffered a serious crash that almost cost him his life. His car locked wheels with Tomas Scheckter's, flew into the catch fencing, and broke apart leaving the cockpit still intact. Bräck's crash saw the highest recorded g-forces since the introduction of crash violence recording systems, peaking at 214 g (while death may occur at >50 g). He suffered multiple fractures, breaking his sternum, femur, shattering a vertebra in his spine and crushing his ankles. He spent eighteen months recovering from his injuries. Though Bräck would return for one additional race, the Texas wreck essentially ended his racing career in IRL.

Bräck made his comeback at the 2005 Indianapolis 500, replacing an injured Buddy Rice (who, coincidentally, had replaced Bräck in 2004). He retired from the race with a mechanical problem, finishing in 26th place.

Retirement
As of 2011, Bräck lives in England and has retired from open wheel racing. Since 2015 Bräck has helped McLaren Automotive working with dynamic car development for their road cars. In May 2018 he took the role as chief test driver. In May 2017 Kenny set the lap record for road legal cars at the Nürburgring Nordschleife with a lap time of 6'43.22, in a McLaren P1 LM, a project he helped develop with Team Lanzante. He continued to occasionally drive in rallying.

For a time he managed future Formula One and IndyCar driver Marcus Ericsson, who became the second Swede after Bräck to win the Indianapolis 500 in 2022.

Bräck also spends his time currently as the lead member and songwriter of his rock band "Bräck", together with lead singer Franc Aledia. At the 2007 Indianapolis 500 the band Bräck cooperated with the Indianapolis Motor Speedway in celebrating American racing legend A. J. Foyt as part of his 50th anniversary at the Indianapolis Motor Speedway. In May 2007 the band released its first album "Greatest hits, volume 1" featuring the song "Legend of the Speedway". A rock video, featuring Foyt's Indianapolis winning cars including the car Bräck won the race with in 1999 while driving for Foyt was also recorded. The video was directed by Allen Farst of Niche Productions, Dayton, Ohio.

Bräck is also on the board of directors of Mekonomen, Scandinavia's biggest distributor of car spare parts, listed on the Swedish stock exchange.

In July 2013, Autosport named Bräck one of the top 50 greatest drivers to have never raced in Formula One.

Other racing
Bräck was employed by Lanzante Motorsport to drive one of the most prestigious cars, a 1964 Shelby Daytona Coupé, in the RAC Tourist Trophy race at the Goodwood Revival in September 2011. Only six original cars exist. Sharing the driving duties with 9-time Le Mans winner Tom Kristensen, Bräck qualified the car on pole position. The duo also won the race. 
In September 2013 Bräck, in partnership with Red Bull F1 Racing's Adrian Newey won the Goodwood revival 50 year anniversary The Whitsun Trophy, where Bräck performed a rain qualifying that went viral on social media. The duo went on to win the race. Also in September Bräck co-drove Christian Glaesel's Ford GT40 in the Spa 6-Hours race, together with the owner and Olivier Ellerbrock. Bräck qualified the car on pole. Eventually the car finished in 5th place.

X Games
In 2009, four years after retiring from IndyCar racing Bräck made a surprise return to the wheel after receiving a special invitation to compete in the annual ESPN X Games 15 in Los Angeles. Bräck drove a Ford Fiesta prepared by Swedish team Olsbergs MSE. Bräck was the fastest qualifier and went on to win the competition outright in a head-to-head final against previous Rally Gold Medal winner and nine time overall X-Games Gold Medal winner Travis Pastrana. Bräck became the first specially invited driver to win the Rally Gold Medal. The late WRC star Colin McRae previously held the top spot with a second-place finish.

Rally
In 2011 Bräck won his second stage rally in his career, Dukerie's Rally outside Nottingham, England, in a Ford Escort Mk II BDG with Swedish co-driver Emil Axelsson.
In July 2011 the duo won the Swedish classic The Midnight Sun Rally in the same car, in front of the previous year's winner Kenneth Bäcklund and rally world champion Björn Waldegård.

Racing record

Complete International Formula 3000 results
(key) (Races in bold indicate pole position) (Races in italics indicate fastest lap)

American open–wheel results
(key)

IndyCar Series

CART

Indianapolis 500

Complete FIA European Rallycross Championship results

Division 1

International Race of Champions
(key) (Bold – Pole position. * – Most laps led.)

References

External links

 Official web site
 Kenny Bräck career statistics
 Kenny Bräck's crash at Texas Motor Speedway in 2003
Band website

1966 births
Living people
People from Arvika Municipality
Swedish racing drivers
British Formula Three Championship drivers
Champ Car drivers
IndyCar Series champions
IndyCar Series drivers
Swedish Formula Three Championship drivers
Indianapolis 500 drivers
Indianapolis 500 winners
International Race of Champions drivers
International Formula 3000 drivers
British Formula 3000 Championship drivers
Swedish expatriates in Belgium
Swedish expatriate sportspeople in the United States
Barber Pro Series drivers
Chip Ganassi Racing drivers
Rahal Letterman Lanigan Racing drivers
Sportspeople from Värmland County
Super Nova Racing drivers
A. J. Foyt Enterprises drivers